Bye Bye Birdie is a 1963 American musical romantic comedy film directed by George Sidney from a screenplay by Irving Brecher, based on Michael Stewart's book of the 1960 musical of the same name. It also features songs by composer Charles Strouse and lyricist Lee Adams, and a score by Johnny Green. Produced by Fred Kohlmar, the film stars Janet Leigh, Dick Van Dyke, Ann-Margret, Maureen Stapleton, Bobby Rydell, Jesse Pearson, and Ed Sullivan.  Van Dyke and featured player Paul Lynde reprised their roles from the original Broadway production. It was also Van Dyke's feature film debut.

The story was inspired by the phenomenon of singer Elvis Presley being drafted into the United States Army in 1957. Jesse Pearson plays the role of teen idol Conrad Birdie, whose character name is a word play on country singer Conway Twitty, who was, at that time, a teen idol pop artist. Presley himself was the first choice for the role of Birdie, but his manager, Colonel Tom Parker, rejected the idea as he did not want Presley in any roles that were parodies of himself or his career. Ed Sullivan appears as himself, host of the popular long-running CBS variety show. The film is credited with making Ann-Margret a superstar during the mid-1960s, leading to her appearing with Presley himself immediately after in Viva Las Vegas (shot in the summer of 1963, but only released in 1964).

In 2006, the film was ranked number 38 on Entertainment Weekly list of the 50 Best High School Movies.

Plot
In 1958, popular rock and roll star Conrad Birdie receives an Army draft notice, devastating his teenage fans nationwide. Despite his doctorate in biochemistry, unsuccessful songwriter Albert Peterson schemes with his secretary and long-suffering girlfriend Rosie DeLeon to have Conrad sing a song Albert will write. Rosie convinces Ed Sullivan to have Conrad perform Albert's song "One Last Kiss" on The Ed Sullivan Show and then kiss a randomly chosen high school girl goodbye before joining the Army. After this succeeds, Albert will feel free to marry Rosie, despite his widowed, meddlesome mother Mae's long history of interfering with her son's life.

Columbus, Ohio, is chosen as the location for Conrad's farewell performance. The random lucky girl chosen, Kim MacAfee, is thrilled, unlike her high school sweetheart, Hugo Peabody. The teenagers of nearby Sweet Apple, blissfully unaware of their town's impending fame, are spending the "Telephone Hour" discussing the latest gossip: Kim and Hugo have just gotten pinned (a tradition where a boy gives a girl his fraternity pin, indicating a serious commitment to each other) and Kim feels grown up ("How Lovely to Be a Woman").

Upon Conrad's arrival, the teenaged girls sing their anthem, "We Love You Conrad", but the boys despise him for stealing their girls' attention ("We Hate You Conrad!"). Sweet Apple becomes very popular, but some local adults are unhappy with the sudden celebrity, especially after Conrad's song "Honestly Sincere" and his hip-thrusting moves cause every woman, including the mayor's wife, to faint.

Pressured by the town's notable citizens, Kim's father Harry declines to allow her to kiss Conrad on television, until Albert placates him by promising that his "whole family" will be on Sullivan's TV show ("Hymn for a Sunday Evening"). Albert reveals to Harry that he is actually a biochemist who has developed a miracle supplement for domestic animals that will make a hen lay three eggs a day; they test it on the family's pet tortoise, which speeds out the door. Harry, a fertilizer salesman, sees a great future for himself marketing this pill with Albert.

Hugo feels threatened by Conrad, but Kim reassures him that he is the "One Boy" for her. Rosie, meanwhile, feels unappreciated by Albert, who persuades her to "Put on a Happy Face". Albert's mother Mae shows up, distressed to find the pair together; Harry is also agitated about Conrad's monopoly of his house and Kim's behavioral changes. Both lament the problems with "Kids" today.

During rehearsal for the broadcast, an impatient Conrad kisses Kim (who swoons). Hugo is hurt and Kim and Hugo break up, with all three asserting that they have "A Lot of Livin' to Do". Informed the Russian Ballet has switched to a different dance requiring extra time, therefore eliminating Conrad's song and farewell kiss to Kim, Albert unsuccessfully attempts to convince the Ballet's manager to shorten its performance, and he dejectedly decides to drown his sorrows at Maude's Madcap Café.

Surprisingly, he finds Mae there, playing canasta with the café's owner Mr. Maude, also a widower. Rosie, fed up with Albert and his mother, also goes to the café for "a night to remember". After ordering three drinks (but only gulping down one), Rosie goes into another room where the Shriners convention is taking place. She starts dancing and flirting with the men ("Sultans' Ballet"), but when the scene becomes too wild, Albert rescues her from the crazed Shriners.

The next day, Rosie formulates how to get back Conrad's spot on The Ed Sullivan Show that evening. She slips one of Albert's pills into the orchestra conductor's milk, which speeds up the ballet, amusing the audience, offending the Russians and placing Conrad back on the show to sing "One Last Kiss". However, just as Conrad is about to kiss Kim, Hugo runs onstage and punches him out on the live telecast, which shocks Albert and Rosie.

Kim and Hugo reunite. Albert is free to marry now ("Rosie") and his mother agrees, revealing her own marriage to Mr. Maude. All three couples live happily ever after. Kim, now wiser, bids Conrad a fond goodbye in "Bye Bye Birdie (Reprise)".

Cast

In addition, in uncredited cameo appearances as themselves, are two CBS personalities: former ABC News anchor turned CBS game show host John Daly, doing a live news report from in front of the United States Capitol; and The Ed Sullivan Show orchestra leader Ray Bloch, reprising that role.

Musical numbers
 "Bye Bye Birdie" – Kim
 "The Telephone Hour" – Ursula and Sweet Apple Kids
 "How Lovely to Be a Woman" – Kim
 "We Love/Hate You Conrad" - Kim, Ursula, Hugo and Sweet Apple Kids
 "Honestly Sincere" – Conrad
 "Hymn for a Sunday Evening" – Harry, Doris, Kim and Randolph
 "One Boy" – Kim, Hugo and Rosie
 "Put on a Happy Face" – Albert and Rosie
 "Kids" – Harry, Mae, Albert and Randolph
 "One Last Kiss (Gym Rehearsal)" – Conrad
 "A Lot of Livin' to Do" – Conrad, Kim, Hugo and Sweet Apple Kids
 "Shriner's Ballet" – Rosie (non-vocal dance number)
 "One Last Kiss" – Conrad
 "Rosie" – Albert, Rosie, Kim and Hugo
 "Bye Bye Birdie (Reprise)" – Kim

Differences from stage musical

Several significant changes were made in the plot and character relationships in the film from the stage version. The film was rewritten to showcase the talents of rising star Ann-Margret, adding the title song for her and dropping songs by certain other characters.
 The name of the character Rosie Alvarez was changed to Rosie DeLeon. In both versions the character is a positive portrayal of a Latina; however, the song "Spanish Rose", originally performed in the stage musical by Chita Rivera in a comic, exaggerated Hispanic style to irritate Albert's mother, who is portrayed in the film as annoying and insensitive, but not racist, was dropped for this film.
 In the film, Albert is neither Birdie's agent nor an aspiring English teacher but a talented research chemist. He contributed to Birdie's initial success, and therefore Birdie "owes" him a favor. Albert has not written "One Last Kiss" when Rosie pitches the idea to Sullivan.
 In the film, Lou, of "Almaelou", is Mae's deceased husband. In the musical, he was Al and Mae's dog.
 The film version of "A Lot Of Livin' To Do" features Pearson, Ann-Margret and Rydell in a colorful song-and-dance number staged to show Kim and Hugo trying to make each other jealous.
 The songs "An English Teacher", "Baby, Talk to Me", "What Did I Ever See in Him", and "Normal American Boy" were omitted from the film, as was the "100 Ways to Kill a Man" ballet.
 The plot structure is altered so The Ed Sullivan Show broadcast is at the end of the movie; in the stage musical, it is at the closing of the first act. 
 The film version ends on a brighter note:
 Hugo prevents the "last kiss" by running out on stage and knocking Birdie out with a single punch on live television. In doing so, he wins Kim's heart, and the young couple is reunited. 
 There is no arrest of Conrad for statutory rape, forcing him to flee in disguise.
 In the Broadway musical, Albert's mother is portrayed as a recalcitrant racist and abandoned by her son. In the film, Albert's mother shows up with a man (Mr. Maude) in tow, informs Albert and Rosie that she has married him, and gives Albert and Rosie her blessing for their long-postponed wedding.
 In the film, Albert and Mr. McAfee agree to become partners selling Albert's chemical formulas. 
 The film ends with Ann-Margret singing a slightly revised version of the title song: "Bye Bye Birdie, the Army's got you now...."

Production
According to Ann-Margret, she was cast when director George Sidney saw her dancing while on a date at the Sands Casino on New Year's Eve 1961.

Sidney was so smitten with the rising new star that Janet Leigh was "very upset that all the close-ups were going to Ann-Margret", as Leigh herself was the lead star of the film.

Sidney says originally he was only going to produce and Gower Champion would direct, but Champion told Sidney he could not see it as a film, so Sidney stepped in. "That was a great deal of fun," said Sidney. "It was a young people's picture, with a lot of bright, gay noisy cast members yelling and screaming."

Ann-Margret was paid $3,500 a week and earned $85,000 in all.

Reception

Critcal response
 According to Filmink Ann-Margret "stole the show".

Box office
Bye Bye Birdie grossed $233,825 in its opening week at Radio City Music Hall in New York, a house record at that time. It was the 13th highest-grossing film of 1963, grossing $13.1 million domestically, of which distributor Columbia Pictures received $6.2 million in rentals.

Accolades

In addition, the film was given a Royal Charity Premiere when released in the U.K. on 7 November 1963, at the Odeon Marble Arch, in the presence of Prince Philip, Duke of Edinburgh.

In popular culture

 In 1964, The Carefrees made a novelty record with a song called "We Love You Beatles" based on the song "We Love You Conrad" from Bye Bye Birdie. Released on the London International label #10614, the song peaked at No. 39 on the Billboard Hot 100. At the base of the Plaza Hotel in New York City, where the Beatles were staying for their first appearance on The Ed Sullivan Show, scores of Beatles fans sang the song out so their voices would reach the band in their rooms up above.
In an episode of the television series Mad Men (Season 3, Episode 2), the opening sequence of Bye Bye Birdie is shown (twice), and later Peggy Olson sings the tune to herself in front of a mirror in an attempt to emulate Ann-Margret's appeal as somebody who can "be 25 and act 14", although Ann-Margret was, in fact, 21 at the time of filming, playing 16. Later, in Episode 4, Salvatore Romano directs a knock-off parody of the sequence for a commercial for Pepsi's new diet drink, Patio.
 "One Last Kiss" was featured on an actual episode of The Ed Sullivan Show from January 1967, featuring Gary Lewis & the Playboys. It was one of Lewis' last performances before going into the U.S. Army, so Sullivan chose a girl from the audience to come up to the stage. Lewis sang "One Last Kiss" to her and received that "one last kiss".
In Bye Bye Boyfriend, a Two of a Kind book, the White Oak Academy puts on a school play based on Bye Bye Birdie. Ed Sullivan is mentioned many times, and Mary-Kate wins the part of Kim, even though she auditioned for Rosie. In the book, the characters and the soundtrack of the movie, as well as some of its songs, are mentioned.
In "Wild Barts Can't Be Broken", an episode of the TV series The Simpsons, the kids, adults and seniors of Springfield perform a musical parody of the song "Kids" from Bye Bye Birdie.
 In the popular television series Friends (Season 1, Episode 18), during a charade-like game Monica draws a pictorial representation of the film Bye Bye Birdie for the remainder of the group to identify; however, nobody can.
 The 1995 Oasis album (What's the Story) Morning Glory? derives its title from a line in the song "The Telephone Hour", with the album's title being referenced in the band's single "Morning Glory".  
 The animated show Home Movies references this play (along with Grease) in the episode "Bye Bye Greasy" in which the characters put on a play with similar themes.
 Family Guy references two of the show's signature songs: "The Telephone Hour" (in reference to Peter being diagnosed as retarded in the Season 4 episode "Petarded") and "Honestly Sincere" (performed by Seth MacFarlane, voicing President Barack Obama in the Season 9 episode "New Kidney in Town").
 Sonic Boom, a television series, parodied the song "The Telephone Hour" in the Season 2 episode "Mister Eggman". The parody song consisted of the villagers (including Sonic the Hedgehog and friends) spreading the word that Doctor Eggman never truly earned his doctorate. The song also made reference to the fact that it itself was a parody, breaking the fourth wall.
"Kids" was the musical number at the end of "The Punch and Judy Affair" (Season 7, episode 8 of Are You Being Served?).

See also
 List of American films of 1963
 Bye Bye Birdie (1995 film)

References

Further reading

External links
 
 
 
 
 
 Description of the film

1963 films
1963 musical comedy films
1963 romantic comedy films
1960s English-language films
1960s romantic musical films
1960s satirical films
1960s teen comedy films
1960s teen romance films
American musical comedy films
American rock music films
American rock musicals
American romantic comedy films
American romantic musical films
American satirical films
American teen comedy films
American teen musical films
American teen romance films
Columbia Pictures films
Films about fandom
Films about singers
Films directed by George Sidney
Films based on musicals
Films scored by Charles Strouse
Films scored by Johnny Green
Films set in Ohio
Films set in the 1950s
Films set in 1958
Films with screenplays by Irving Brecher
1960s American films